Cornered is a 1932 American pre-Code Western film directed by B. Reeves Eason and starring Tim McCoy. It was produced and released by Columbia Pictures.

A copy is held by the Library of Congress.

Principal Cast
Tim McCoy - Sheriff Tim Laramie
Shirley Grey - Jane Herrick
Noah Beery - Laughing Red Slavens
Raymond Hatton - Deputy Jacklin
Niles Welch - Moody Pierson
Claire McDowell - Jane's Aunt
Walter Long - Henchman Slade
Walter Brennan - court clerk (uncredited)
Edmund Cobb - ranch hand (uncredited)

Plot
Sheriff Laramie maintains that his friend (Pierson) is innocent of murder. Laramie is fired after Pierson escapes, and the two join an outlaw gang. Laramie and Pierson are rescued, and the real killer is revealed.

References

External links

1932 films
1932 Western (genre) films
American Western (genre) films
Films directed by B. Reeves Eason
Columbia Pictures films
1930s American films